Donovan Taofifénua (born 30 March 1999) is a French rugby union player. He plays as a wing for Racing 92 in the Top 14. He is a cousin of France internationals Romain Taofifénua and Sébastien Taofifénua and is of Wallisian heritage.

Career 
Emerging from ASM Clermont Auvergne's rank, Taofifénua was a member of the France U20 team that won the 2019 World Rugby Championship, and made his club debut during the 2019–20 season.

He joined Racing 92 the next season, in search for more game time. There he scored six tries in the first part of the season, earning a first call-up for the French national team for the Autumn Nations Cup final against England.

Honours

International 
 France (U20)
World Rugby Under 20 Championship winner: 2019

Notes and references

External links 
It's Rugby profile
France profile at FFR

1999 births
Living people
Sportspeople from Grenoble
French rugby union players
ASM Clermont Auvergne players
Racing 92 players
Rugby union wings